A stab in the back may refer to:
The argument that Ottoman Christian population committed treason during World War I, justifying their killing (see Armenian genocide denial)
In Richard Wagner's opera Götterdämmerung, the killing of the hero Siegfried by a spear thrust in his back.
The Stab-in-the-back myth, the belief that the German Army did not lose World War I militarily, but was defeated by a treasonous "stab in the back" by civilians, in particular Jews and Socialists. 
Vietnam stab-in-the-back myth, a similar belief concerning the United States' loss of the Vietnam War
"Stab in the Back", a song by Terrorvision from How to Make Friends and Influence People (1994)